Anna Vasilyevna Antonenko-Lukonina  (born January 6, 1937) is a Soviet and Russian  actress, People's Artist of Russia  (2007).

Biography 
Anna Antonenko-Lukonina was born on January 6, 1937. In 1959, she completed GITIS (Iosif Raevski's course).

In 1959–1960, she worked in the Gorky District Drama Theater (Arzamas-16), later known as the Sarov Drama Theater.

She was married to a Russian poet Mikhail Lukonin (1918–1976).

In 1960, she played in the Malaya Bronnaya Theater in Moscow.

Selected filmography 
 Investigation Held by ZnaToKi, as Irina Sergeevna Maslova (TV Series, 1971)
 Long Farewell, as Anna Vasilievna (2004)
 The New Year's Rate Plan, as elderly passenger (2008)

References

External links
 

1937 births
Living people
Soviet film actresses
Russian film actresses
Soviet stage actresses
Russian stage actresses
Soviet television actresses
Russian television  actresses
Recipients of the Medal of the Order "For Merit to the Fatherland" II class
People's Artists of Russia
Honored Artists of the RSFSR
Russian Academy of Theatre Arts alumni
20th-century Russian actresses
21st-century Russian actresses